Katherine Anandi Rowe is an American scholar of Renaissance literature and media history. She was named the twenty-eighth president of the College of William & Mary on February 20, 2018. She began her service on July 2, 2018 succeeding W. Taylor Reveley III, who had served as president since 2008. After seven months in office, Rowe was formally inaugurated February 8, 2019 as part of the university's annual Charter Day ceremony.

Rowe, a Shakespearean scholar, is recognized for her work in the digital innovation of the liberal arts. As the guest editor of the Shakespeare Quarterly's special issue on New Media, Rowe led the first open review of a traditional humanities journal on the web. The New York Times deemed the special issue "trailblazing." In a 2020 special report, Diverse: Issues in Higher Education highlighted Rowe as one of 35 leading women in higher education.

Rowe served as provost and dean of the faculty of Smith College from 2014 to 2018. While at Smith, she also served as the interim vice president for inclusion, diversity and equity. In this role, Rowe is credited with transforming Smith's liberal arts curriculum and increasing diversity in faculty hiring. During her tenure as provost, Smith College developed "one of the first statistical and data sciences majors at a liberal arts college…” as well as worked to integrate design thinking methodology across curricula. Rowe also oversaw the creation of Smith College's first MOOC (Massive Open Online Course).

Prior to Smith, she served as an English professor at Bryn Mawr College from 1998 to 2014, and at Yale University from 1992 to 1998, teaching courses exploring the history of reading, writing, and performance from the Renaissance to the digital age. In another leadership position, she served as the director for the Tri-College Digital Humanities Initiative, a collaboration of faculty, students and staff from Bryn Mawr, Haverford and Swarthmore Colleges as well as the Mellon Tri-College Faculty Forum, a group supporting collaboration between the three colleges’ faculty members. An entrepreneur, Rowe is also the co-founder and was chief executive officer of Luminary Digital Media, an organization responsible for creating social reading apps in partnership with the Folger Library Shakespeare editions on the iPad.

Rowe and her husband, Bruce Jacobson, a telecom entrepreneur, co-founded the nonprofit Boston Ultimate Disc Alliance and Rowe co-founded the Carleton College women's Ultimate team. As a player, Rowe was a World Ultimate Club Finalist and a Women's National Finalist. She has served as an Ultimate coach for more than a decade and led multiple teams to state championships in Pennsylvania. It was also through Ultimate that Rowe met and married Jacobson.

Rowe received a bachelor's degree in English and American literature from Carleton College in 1984. She earned a master's and a Ph.D. in English and American literature from Harvard University. Mid-career, Rowe completed graduate work in Cinema and Media Studies at New York University's Tisch School of the Arts. She is the recipient of grants from the National Endowment for Humanities, the Mellon Foundation, and the Pennsylvania Department of Education. Rowe also served as President  of the Shakespeare Association of America and the Associate General Editor of The Cambridge Guide to the Worlds of Cambridge. She also served on Harvard University's Board of Overseers’ Visiting Committee of the Library and on the Executive Committee of the American Council of Learned Societies. She has also been a member of the Modern Language Association, International Shakespeare Association and the Society for Cinema and Media Studies. She was inducted into Omicron Delta Kappa - The National Leadership Honor Society, in 2018 at William & Mary.

Rowe and Bruce Jacobson have two adult children.

Selected works 

New Wave Shakespeare on Screen with Thomas Cartelli (Polity Press, 2007) 
Reading the Early Modern Passions: Essays in the Cultural History of Emotion (Penn Press, 2004) 
Dead Hands: Fictions of Agency, Renaissance to Modern (Stanford UP, 1999)

References

1963 births
Living people
College of William & Mary faculty
Presidents of the College of William & Mary
Carleton College alumni
Harvard University alumni
Smith College people
Bryn Mawr College faculty
Women heads of universities and colleges